The gens Carteia was a Roman family towards the end of the Republic.  It is best remembered for a single individual, Lucius Carteius, a friend of Gaius Cassius Longinus, who was with Cassius in Syria in 43 B.C.

See also
 List of Roman gentes

Footnotes

Roman gentes